Acharya Girish Chandra Bose College, (formerly called Bangabasi College of Commerce) established in its current form in 1964, is an undergraduate college in Kolkata, West Bengal, India. It is affiliated with the University of Calcutta. It offers undergraduate courses in arts and commerce. Acharya Girish Chandra Bose College was accredited by National Assessment and Accreditation Council (NAAC) in 2011 with a 'B' Grade.

History of the college
Girish Chandra Bose founded two institutions of learning: Bangabasi School in 1885 and Bangabasi College in 1887.  These were reorganized in 1964–1965 to Bangabasi Morning College, Bangabasi Evening College, and Bangabasi College of Commerce.  Bangabasi College of Commerce was renamed after the founder of Bangabasi College in 2005.

Departments

Arts and Commerce

Bengali
English
Sanskrit
Commerce - Accounting & Finance

Accreditation
Acharya Girish Chandra Bose College (Bangabasi College of Commerce) is recognized by the University Grants Commission.

See also 
Bangabasi College
List of colleges affiliated to the University of Calcutta
Education in India
Education in West Bengal

References

External links
Acharya Girish Chandra Bose College (Official website)

Educational institutions established in 1964
University of Calcutta affiliates
Universities and colleges in Kolkata
1964 establishments in West Bengal